Ronnie Fieg is an American footwear and clothing designer, entrepreneur and the owner-operator of American retail fashion establishment and brand Kith.

Early life and education 
Aaron 'Ronnie' Fieg was born and raised in Jamaica, Queens in New York City. Fieg began working as a stock boy and salesman for David Z, his uncle's footwear chain, at the age of 13, eventually becoming a manager and head buyer there.

Career 
While working at David Z, Fieg began bringing in many of the athletic footwear brands for the chain of stores. One of these brands was Asics, who offered Fieg the opportunity to collaborate on new designs based on their existing shoe models. Fieg then designed three pairs of Gel Lyte IIIs called "The 252 Pack", due to each sneaker being produced in quantities of 252. Fieg's new sneaker designs ended up on the cover of The Wall Street Journal, and sold out in 24 hours, helping to launch him on a new career path.

He has since gone on to collaborate with many other brands such as Adidas, Caminando, Chippewa, Clarks, Converse, Harris Tweed, Herschel Supply, New Balance, Polo Ralph Lauren, PUMA, Red Wings, Saucony, Sebago, Shades of Grey by Micah Cohen, and Timberland. His total number of collaborations is estimated at over 50 products.

On November 11, 2011, Fieg opened up his own apparel and footwear boutique called Kith NYC. As of October 2022 it has twelve locations; the first location opened was in Brooklyn, and the second in Manhattan. In December 2015 the brand opened its first women's retail location in Manhattan. Kith carries brands including Yeezy, Stampd, Timberland, Adidas, Red Wing, Clarks, Asics, Danner, New Balance, Nike, Gourmet, and Native Footwear.

In August 2015, Fieg updated his Brooklyn store. The renovated space featured the new Kith Treats business, 750 cast white Air Jordan 2s hanging from the ceiling and overall design by Daniel Arsham and Alex Mustonen of Snarkitecture, who would go on to design the store's other locations as well. Kith Treats is a bar offering 23 varieties of breakfast cereal with assorted toppings and milk selections, as well as ice cream.

In July 2016, Kith opened a co-branded six month pop-up shop in collaboration with Nike also containing a custom Kith Treats, adjacent to the brand's Manhattan location. The design included white cast air Jordan 4s in reference to it being the company's fourth location. That year's "90's look" collection at drew attention at New York Fashion Week and involved 25 other brands.  The company then opened a pop-up store in Aspen, Colorado and a permanent location in Miami. Participating brands included A Bathing Ape, Nike, Adidas, New Balance, Power Rangers and Rugrats. In 2017, Kith added an Aimé Leon Dore x KITH collaboration to its line. Fieg also expanded the Kith treats business, including a collaboration with Cap'n Crunch, new pop-up shops and an accessories and apparel line. In 2018, Kith collaborated with Coca-Cola, Tommy Hilfiger, and The Jetsons. Upcoming collaborations with Versace and Greg Lauren were teased by Fieg via Instagram.

During 2017, Kith added a collaboration with Nike and LeBron James and also an art/apparel project with visual artist Daniel Arsham.

Together with BMW, Kith has designed a version of the All-New BMW M4 Competition, constructing exclusive modifications to the interior and exterior. Only 150 vehicles are available in this limited-edition model, across three color selections and riveting optional equipment.

Personal life
In July 2017, Fieg married Shira Yaakov in Tel Aviv, Israel. 

Along with releasing his own sneaker collaborations, Ronny Fieg is a prominent shoe collector himself. In an interview with lifestyle/fashion magazine Hodinkee, Fieg opened his office to display his extensive collection. Fieg collects a variety of footwear from classic Jordans to New York staples such as Timberland boots.

References

Shoe designers
Living people
People from Queens, New York
Year of birth missing (living people)